Arte Al Limite (AAL) is a bi-monthly Spanish-language magazine which focuses on trends in contemporary art. Founded in 2002 by Ana María Matthei, Arte Al Limite is based in Santiago, Chile, and is published in both Spanish and English. Publishing consists of a free newspaper, which monthly analyzes the Chilean and Latin American contemporary art and luxury collector's magazine. As part of its project, Arte al Limite also maintains a web platform and a virtual museum.

References

Contemporary art magazines